This is a list of high schools in Ecuador.

Quito

Academia Cotopaxi
Academia USA
Alliance Academy International
 Colegio Aleman
Colegio Americano de Quito
Colegio Benalcazar
Colegio Dalcroze
Colegio Experimental Británico Internacional
Colegio Experimental Hipatia Cárdenas de Bustamante
Colegio Experimental Juan Pio Montufar
Colegio Europeo Pachamama
Colegio Gutenberg Schule
Colegio La Condamine
Colegio ISM
Colegio Militar Eloy Alfaro
Colegio La Salle
Colegio Marista
Colegio Menor San Francisco de Quito
 Colegio San Gabriel
Colegio Nuestra Madre de la Merced
Colegio Sauce
Colegio SEK
Colegio Spellman
 Colegio Terranova Quito
Instituto Nacional Mejía
The British School, Quito 
Unidad Educativa Letort
Unidad Educativa Hontanar
Unidad Educativa Santa Maria Eufrasia
Unidad Educativa Tomas Moro

Guayaquil
 Boston International High School
 Centro Educativo Nuevo Mundo
 Colegio Alemán Humboldt de Guayaquil 
 Colegio Americano de Guayaquil 
 Colegio Bilingüe Jefferson
 Colegio Internacional Sek Guayaquil
  Colegio Javier
 InterAmerican Academy 
 IPAC
 Colegio Particular Experimental Politécnico
 Unidad Educativa La Moderna

Cuenca
Colegio SANTANA, Cuenca
Colegio "Las Cumbres", Cuenca
Colegio Calderon, Cuenca
Colegio Bilingue Interamericano, Cuenca
Colegio Borja, Cuenca
Colegio Latinoamericano, Cuenca
Colegio Santanahttp, Cuenca
Colegio Alemán, Cuenca
Colegio César Dávila Andrade, Cuenca
Politécnico Kennedy, Cuenca
 Comunidad Educativa CEDFI
Colegio Benigno Malo, Cuenca
Colegio la Salle, Cuenca
Colegio Manuel J. Calle
Unidad Educativa Bilingüe Interamericana, Cuenca
 Unidad Educativa Salesiana Maria Auxiliadora, Cuenca
 Centro Educativo Bilingue Integral , Cuenca
Unidad educativa Técnico Salesiano

Provincia de Manabí

Chone
 Colegio El Bejucal

Manta
 Unidad Educativa Jehová Es Mi Pastor
 Colegio Jefferson http://www.jefferson.edu.ec/
 Unidad Educativa Jehová Es Mi Pastor
 Liceo Naval
 Colegio Srtas Manta
 Colegio Stella Maris

Montecristi
U.E Tecnologico Almirante H. Nelson,

Porto Viejo
 Unidad Educativa Santo Tomás
 Colegio General militar Miguel Iturralde Jaramillo
 Unidad Educativa ArcoIris, Portoviejo
 Colegio Olmedo
 Cruz Del Norte High School http://www.colegiocruzdelnorte.com/index.php?option=com_content&view=frontpage&Itemid=33
 Escuela Acuarela
 Unidad Educativa Jean Piaget
 Coelgio Cristo Rey

Calceta
 Colegio Técnico Mercedes
 Centro Educativo Wenceslao Rijavec
 Colegio Pablo VI,

Colegio Pensionado Universitario
Nuestra Madre de la Merced
Colegio Santa Mariana de Jesús, Portoviejo-Chone

Otras ciudades

Ambato
Colegio Bolívar

Baños
Colegio Instituto Superior Oscar Efren Reyes

Loja
Colegio Experimental "Bernardo Valdivieso"

Píllaro
Unidad Educativa Jorge Alvarez, Píllaro

Salinas
Colegio Jefferson

Riobamba
Colegio San Felipe Neri

Ecuador
Ecuador
High schools